Yang Cheng, may refer to:

Yang Cheng (born 1985), a Chinese football goalkeeper who currently plays for Hebei China Fortune in the Chinese Super League.

Yang Cheng (born 1964), is a lieutenant general of the People's Liberation Army (PLA) and the current political commissar of the Xinjiang Military District.